is a Japanese footballer who plays as a midfielder for Eredivisie club Sparta on loan from Belgian club Lommel.

Club career
After impressive performances with the Japan U-17 team, Koki Saito debuted on 21 July 2018 in a league match against FC Gifu. On his debut, Saito even had the chance to share the field with Kazuyoshi Miura, who is 34 years his senior.

In January 2021, he joined Belgian First Division B side Lommel. In summer 2022 he was loaned to Eredivisie side Sparta.

Career statistics

References

External links
 Koki Saito at j-league.or.jp 
 Koki Saito at jleague.jp (archived) 
 Koki Saito at Yokohama FC (archived) 

2001 births
Living people
Association football people from Tokyo
Japanese footballers
Japan youth international footballers
Association football forwards
Yokohama FC players
Lommel S.K. players
Sparta Rotterdam players
J1 League players
J2 League players
Challenger Pro League players
Japanese expatriate footballers
Expatriate footballers in Belgium
Japanese expatriate sportspeople in Belgium
Expatriate footballers in the Netherlands
Japanese expatriate sportspeople in the Netherlands
Japan under-20 international footballers